Mustafa Hussein may refer to:

 Mustafa Hussein (cartoonist), Egyptian cartoonist
 Mustafa Hussein (footballer), British-Turkish Cypriot football player for Crawley Town FC
 Mustafa Hussein (handballer), Egyptian handballer